Granite Connection High School is an alternative public high school in South Salt Lake, Utah.  Connection belongs to the Granite School District.

References

External links

Granite School District

Public high schools in Utah
Schools in Salt Lake County, Utah
Buildings and structures in South Salt Lake, Utah